Sustainability declarations are checklists of sustainability features that were a requirement to be completed by home-owners and vendors in Queensland, Australia before a home can be sold.
The checklist identifies the property's environmental and social sustainability features in the four areas of energy, water, safety, and access.

Information
Home owners must complete these sustainability checklists or risk being fined up to $4000. Advertising for homes must also include details about where the Sustainability Declaration for the property can be viewed. Properties that have a larger number of sustainability features generate fewer greenhouse gas emissions, use less energy for heating and cooling, use less water and are more comfortable to live in. They also can have fewer operating costs and be more energy and water efficient.

Sustainability Declaration now no longer needed for Queensland home owners August 2012

References

External links
 Official site
 Declaration form
 Sustainability Declaration: Have Your Say
 Final Inspection Checklist - New House & Pre Settlement

Checklists
Sustainable building
Sustainable urban planning